Deerfield is a census-designated place (CDP) in the town of Deerfield in Franklin County, Massachusetts, United States.  The population was 643 at the 2010 census. It corresponds roughly to the area of Historic Deerfield, a historic district comprising the original town center of Deerfield. It is the home of Deerfield Academy, a college-preparatory school.

Geography

Demographics
US Census population 2016 = 479

References

External links
 Town of Deerfield
 Deerfield Academy

Census-designated places in Franklin County, Massachusetts
Springfield metropolitan area, Massachusetts
Census-designated places in Massachusetts